James William Lowther, 1st Viscount Ullswater,  (1 April 1855 – 27 March 1949), was a British Conservative politician. He was Speaker of the House of Commons between 1905 and 1921. He was the longest-serving Speaker of the 20th century.

Background and education
The son of Hon. William Lowther, a grandson of William Lowther, 1st Earl of Lonsdale and for 25 years Member of Parliament for Westmorland, and Alice, 3rd daughter of James Parke, 1st Baron Wensleydale, Lowther was educated at Eton College, King's College London where he took an Associateship degree, and at Trinity College, Cambridge, where he studied classics and law. Lowther became a barrister in 1879, eventually becoming a Bencher of the Inner Temple in 1906.

Political career
He was Member of Parliament for Rutland in 1883; contested Mid Cumberland in 1885; and sat for Penrith from 1886 to 1921. He was appointed 4th Charity Commissioner in 1887, and held junior ministerial office as Parliamentary Under-Secretary of State for Foreign Affairs from 1891 to 1892. He was Chairman of Ways and Means and Deputy Speaker from 1895 to 1905 and Speaker of the House of Commons from 1905 to 1921.

Other public appointments

Lowther represented Great Britain at the International Conference at Venice in 1892, and at the International Conference on Emigration at Rome in 1924. He was Chairman of the Speakers' Electoral Reform Conference in 1916–1917, of the Buckingham Palace Conference (on the partition of Ulster) in 1914, of the Boundary Commissions (Great Britain and Ireland) in 1917, of the Royal Commission on Proportional Representation in 1918, Devolution Conference in 1919, of the Royal Commission on London Government, 1921–1922; of Review Committee Political Honours, 1923–1924, and Statutory Commission on Cambridge University, 1923; of the Agricultural Wages Board from 1930 to 1940; of the Lords and Commons Committee on Electoral Reform, 1929–1930; and of BBC Enquiry Committee, 1935. He was a Trustee of the British Museum from 1922 to 1931 and a Trustee of the National Portrait Gallery from 1925. In 1907 his portrait was painted by Philip de Laszlo.

Honours
He was appointed to the Privy Council in 1898, created 1st Viscount Ullswater, of Campsea Ashe, in the County of Suffolk, on his retirement as Speaker in 1921, and appointed a Knight Grand Cross of the Order of the Bath (GCB) in July 1921. He also held the degrees of DCL from the University of Oxford, LL.D from the University of Cambridge and DCL from the University of Leeds.

Arms

Family
On 1 March 1886, Lowther married Mary Frances Beresford-Hope (d. 16 May 1944). They had three children:
Major Christopher William Lowther (b. 18 January 1887, d. 7 January 1935).
Arthur James Beresford Lowther (b. 28 October 1888, d. 2 March 1967)
Mildred Lowther (b. 1890, d. 2 July 1973)

He was succeeded to the viscountcy by his great-grandson.

Footnotes

External links

Campsea Ashe garden
Electoral Reform Conference, 1917
Proportional Representation Conference, 1918
Devolution Conference, 1919

1855 births
1949 deaths
People educated at Eton College
Alumni of King's College London
Associates of King's College London
Fellows of King's College London
Alumni of Trinity College, Cambridge
Viscounts in the Peerage of the United Kingdom
Members of the Privy Council of the United Kingdom
Lowther, James
Lowther, James
Lowther, James
Knights Grand Cross of the Order of the Bath
English justices of the peace
Lowther, James
Lowther, James
Lowther, James
Lowther, James
Lowther, James
Lowther, James
Lowther, James
Lowther, James
UK MPs who were granted peerages
Members of the Inner Temple
James
Presidents of the Marylebone Cricket Club
Viscounts created by George V